Abid is an actor, model and a singer who predominantly works in Hindi and Malayalam film industries. He is known for his lead role in the movie Rani Rani Rani starring Tannishtha Chatterjee, Asif Basra, Alexx O'Nell etc. He is also known for his character roles in the movies Innanu Aa Kalyanam, Flat No 4B, Kerala Nattilam Pengaludane etc. He is also an award winner of Gandarva Sangeetham music reality show conducted by Kairali TV in 2011 and a semifinalist in the reality show conducted by Jeevan TV in 2009. He has also acted in over 80 television advertisements.

References

Male actors in Tamil cinema
Living people
Male actors from Kochi
Male actors in Malayalam cinema
Indian male film actors
21st-century Indian male actors
1986 births